This was the first edition of the tournament.

Adam Pavlásek and Igor Zelenay won the title after defeating Rafael Matos and David Vega Hernández 6–3, 3–6, [10–6] in the final.

Seeds

Draw

References

External links
 Main draw

Open Comunidad de Madrid - Doubles